The Hemiodontidae are a small family of freshwater characins found in northern South America, south to the Paraná-Paraguay Basin. The larger species are popular food fish.

Hemiodontids have a streamlined body shape; many are fast-swimming, and are able to leap out of the water to escape predators. The adults of all species except Micromischodus sugillatus have no teeth on their lower jaws. Most species have a round spot on the side of the midbody and a stripe along the lower lobe of the caudal fin.

Genera
The family has around 29 known species, as well as several undescribed species, in five genera:
Anodus
Argonectes
Bivibranchia
Hemiodus
Micromischodus

References

Nelson, Joseph S. (2006). Fishes of the World. John Wiley & Sons, Inc. 

 
Fish of South America